Miacora tropicalis is a moth in the family Cossidae. It was described by Schaus in 1904. It is found in Guyana.

References

Natural History Museum Lepidoptera generic names catalog

Cossinae
Moths described in 1904